Bournemouth Central may refer to:

 Bournemouth Central (ward)
 Bournemouth Central railway station